Emilio Romero is a retired American soccer forward who played professionally in the North American Soccer League, American Soccer League and the Major Indoor Soccer League /Colorado Comets South West Professional League 1984-1988 Player Coach . / USA National team 1976 ./ Colorado Youth Hall Fame / Metro State University Hall of Fame.

Player
Romero played collegiate soccer at [Metropolitan State University of Denver] Leading scorer in the nation (NAIA) and (NCAA) 1977 Record held for 13 years.  In 1978, he signed with the Minnesota Kicks of the North American Soccer League. 1979, he moved to the Columbus Magic of American Soccer League.  That fall, he moved indoors with the St. Louis Steamers of the Major Indoor Soccer League.  He played two full seasons with the Steamers, then began the 1981–1982 season in St. Louis before being traded to the Kansas City Comets.  In the summer of 1980, he played for the Golden Gate Gales of the ASL and finished his career with the Los Angeles Lazers during the 1982–1983 MISL season. Colorado Comets South West Professional League 1984–1988. /USA National Team 1976.

Coach
On February 1, 1996, the Colorado Rapids hired Emilio as an assistant coach.
/APSL FT. Lauderdale Sttrikers /  Miami Freedom 1992- 1995
/APSL Colorado Foxes Head Coach 1989-1991 
/Colorado Comets South West Professional League 1984–1988.

He is  co-owner of Agencia Romero, a financial services company, with his brother Luis.
CO- Owner Truseals International present.

References

External links
 Career stats

1954 births
Living people
Soccer players from Denver
American soccer coaches
American soccer players
American Soccer League (1933–1983) players
Columbus Magic players
Kansas City Comets (original MISL) players
Minnesota Kicks players
North American Soccer League (1968–1984) players
Major Indoor Soccer League (1978–1992) players
St. Louis Steamers (original MISL) players
Association football forwards